The Nineties (1993 A.D. Through 1999 A.D.) is a compilation album by Green Velvet. It was released on Music Man Records in 1999.

Critical reception

Prasad Bidaye of Exclaim! wrote, "For those who've never had the Green Velvet experience, this 12-track best-of compilation makes for a good introduction, featuring most of his classic tracks." He added, "Considering how techno purists tend to celebrate its conventional instrumental form, Green Velvet's bizarre narratives reclaim the human voice as an organic, yet estranged force in music."

Track listing

References

External links
 

1999 compilation albums
Green Velvet albums